The 1937 Stalybridge and Hyde by-election was held on 28 April 1937.  The by-election was held due to the resignation of the incumbent Conservative MP, Philip Dunne.  It was won by the Conservative candidate Horace Trevor-Cox.

The Labour candidate, the Reverend Gordon Lang was the former MP for Oldham and in the 1945 general election won the seat on a large swing.

References

1937 elections in the United Kingdom
1937 in England
20th century in Cheshire
By-elections to the Parliament of the United Kingdom in Greater Manchester constituencies
By-elections to the Parliament of the United Kingdom in Cheshire constituencies
Stalybridge